The Museum of the Revolution is located in the Old Havana section of Havana, Cuba, in what was the Presidential Palace of all Cuban presidents from Mario García Menocal to Fulgencio Batista. The building became the Museum of the Revolution during the years following the Cuban Revolution. The palace building was attacked by the Directorio Revolucionario Estudiantil in 1957.

Building

The  Presidential Palace was designed by the Cuban architect Rodolfo Maruri and the Belgian architect Paul Belau  who also designed the Centro Gallego, presently the  Gran Teatro de La Habana. The Presidential Palace was inaugurated in 1920 by President Mario García Menocal. It remained the Presidential Palace until the Cuban Revolution of 1959.  The building has Neo-Classical elements and was decorated by Tiffany Studios of New York City.

The building was the site of an attack in March 1957 where the Directorio Revolucionario Estudiantil from the University of Havana attempted to kill Fulgencio Batista. It was a two-prong attack which included the take over of Radio Relox at the Radiocentro CMQ Building. Both attacks failed. According to one of the attackers, Faure Chomón of the Revolutionary Directorate, they were following the golpe arriba strategy and together with Menelao Mora Morales sought to overthrow the government by killing President Fulgencio Batista.

Exhibits
The museum's Cuban history exhibits are largely devoted to the period of the revolutionary war of the 1950s and to the country's post-1959 history.  Portions of the museum are also devoted to pre-revolutionary Cuba, including the 1895-1898 War of Independence waged against Spain, and an exhibit honoring American President Abraham Lincoln.

Gallery

See also

Havana Presidential Palace attack (1957)
List of buildings in Havana
Humboldt 7 massacre
Radiocentro CMQ Building
Directorio Revolucionario Estudiantil
Faure Chomón
José Antonio Echeverría
Eloy Gutiérrez Menoyo
Rolando Cubela Secades

References

External links
Cuando los universitarios se levantaron contra el gobernante de Cuba (FOTOS)
Revolt in Havana. Chicago Daily Tribune. March 14, 1957.
No Eran Estudiantes los Que Atacaron el Palacio.

Verdades del Ataque al Palacio Presidencial el 13 de Marzo de 1957

Buildings and structures completed in 1920
Museums in Havana
History museums
Cuban Revolution
Neoclassical architecture in Cuba
Presidential residences
Buildings and structures in Havana
1920 establishments in Cuba
Museums established in 1959
20th-century architecture in Cuba